Lee Se-Hwan  (Hangul: 이세환; born 21 April 1986) is a South Korean football player who plays for the Goyang Hi FC in the K League Challenge.

He played for Ulsan Hyundai in the K-League.

External links 

1986 births
Living people
South Korean footballers
Ulsan Hyundai FC players
Daejeon Korail FC players
Goyang Zaicro FC players
K League 1 players
Korea National League players
K League 2 players
Association football defenders
Association football forwards